Nettur Technical Training Foundation operates more than 20 training centers around India, at Bangalore, Baddi, Bellary, Coimbatore, Dharwad, Gannavaram, Gopalpur-Odisha, Hyderabad, Jamshedpur, Kumbakonam, Kuttippuram, Malappuram, Murbad, Tellicherry, Tuticorin, Vadakkencherry and Vellore.

History

On 12 April 1958, the Nettur Technical Training Foundation, the successor to the CSI Technical Training Institute, was established as a joint venture between Church of South India and HEKS (Hilfswerk der Evangelischen Kirchen der Schweiz) of Switzerland. According to HEKS's website, the project's initial funds were raised from regional established churches in Zürich, Aargau, Basel and Schaffhausen.

On 24 November 1959, Mr. Kaderkutty, managing director of Western India Plywoods, Valapattanam, formally inaugurated the training center at Nettur. The first batch of tool and die-maker trainees, 16 boys, were admitted in November 1959. They subsequently appeared for NCTVT (National Council for Training in Vocational Trades, presently known as NCVT) in January 1962 and completed the four-year course in 1964. The initial plan was a 3.5-year training period, but it was extended to four years, which remains in effect today.

Swiss technical expert Alfred Frischknecht was HEKS' first appointee to principal of the Nettur centre. After seven years in India, he relocated to HEKS's headquarters in Zürich, Switzerland to direct development projects.

It was realised from its inception that the institution would be costly to set up and maintain. The Church of South India placed some of its land and buildings at Nettur, Tellicherry at the institute's disposal. Some buildings were reconditioned and a few new ones were built by NTTF. The donor agencies assured the necessary funds, supplies of adequate machine tools and accessories, and deputation of technical experts from abroad.

1964 another training centre was established in Dharwad, Karnataka, again on property donated by the CSI church of Karnataka; and another center was established the same year in Vellore, Tamil Nadu. The centre's headquarters was moved to Peenya, Bangalore after the establishment of a toolroom and training center there in 1978.

Time line
 1959: NTTF Technical Training Centre, Nettur, Tellicherry (Kerala)
 1964: NTTF Technical Training Centre, Dharwad (Karnataka)
 1964: NTTF Technical Training Centre, Vellore (Tamil Nadu)
 1978: NTTF Technical Training Centre, Peenya, Bangalore (Karnataka)
 1982: NTTF Technical Training Centre, Electronic City, Bangalore (Karnataka)
 1982: NTTF Technical Training Centre, Gannavaram (Andhra Pradesh)
 1983: NTTF PG School, Bangalore
 1997: NTTF Technical Training Centre at GKDITR, Coimbatore (Tamil Nadu)
 2000: NTTF IT Centre, Bangalore
 2000: NTTF Technical Training Centre at SIT, Tumkur (Karnataka)
 2000: NTTF Advance Technical Training Centre at Bardang, Singtam, sikkim
 2001: NTTF Technical Training Centre at OEN India Ltd, Kochi (Kerala)
 2001: NTTF Technical Training Centre at Southern Petro Chemical Industries (SPIC), Tuticorin (Tamil Nadu)
 2002: NTTF Technical Training Centre at Keltron Ltd, Trivandrum (Kerala),(Centre closed on 2010)
 2003: NTTF Technical Training Centre at R D TATA Technical Education Center, Jamshedpur (Jharkhand)
 2005: NTTF Technical Training Centre at J.N. TATA Technical Education Center, Gopalpur
 2006: NTTF Technical Training Centre at NOKIA India Pvt. Ltd, Sriperumbudur.
 2006: NTTF IT Centre DIOCESE, Alleppey (Kerala)
 2006: NTTF IT Centre, Shimoga (Karnataka)
 2006: NTTF Technical Training Centre at Thiagarajar College of Engineering, Madurai (Tamil Nadu)
 2006: NTTF IT Centre at IRIS Manufacturing Ltd, Chengalpet
 2007: NTTF Technical Training Centre at Seyanmarsal Vocational Training Center
 2008: NTTF Technical Training Centre at Keltron Campus, Mudadi (Kerala)
 2008: NTTF Technical Training Centre at VSVN Polytechnic, Virudhunagar
 2008: NTTF Technical Training Centre at Chandana Education Society, Lakshmeswar
 2008: NTTF Technical Training Centre at JSW, Bellary (Karnataka)
 2009: NTTF Technical Education Centre, Pantnagar, Uttarakhand
 2009: NTTF Vocational Training Centre, Savanur
 2010: NTTF Technical Training Centre at HBL Campus, HBL Nagar (Andhra Pradesh)
 2010: NTTF Technical Training Centre at SSN Campus Murbad (Maharastra)
 2012: NTTF Technical Training Centre at KELTRON, Malappuram (Kerala)
 2012: Govt. Community College, Vadakkencherry (Kerala)-NTTF acting as an Incubating agency
 2013: NTTF Technical Training Centre at INKEL Edu City, Malappuram (Kerala)
 2014: NTTF Technical Training Centre at Kumbakonam (Tamil Nadu)
 2014: NTTF Technical Training Center at TATA STEEL TECHNICAL INSTITUTE (BURMAMINES), JAMSHEDPUR (Jharkhand)

See also
 Educational Institutes in Thalassery

References

Educational institutions established in 1963
Education in Thoothukudi
1963 establishments in Mysore State
Educational organisations based in India
Companies based in Bangalore
Engineering universities and colleges in India